Monday Merotohun (born 2 November 1977 in Ado-Odo, Ogun) is a Nigerian table tennis player. Playing with his partner Segun Toriola, Merotohun defeated Egypt's El-sayed Lashin and Ahmed Saleh for the gold medal in the men's doubles at the 2007 All-Africa Games in Algiers, Algeria. As of September 2012, Merotohun is ranked no. 184 in the world by the International Table Tennis Federation (ITTF). He is a member of AS TT Sport Club Etna Riposto in Catania, Sicily, Italy, and is coached and trained by Obisanya Babatunde. Merotohun is also right-handed, and uses the shakehand grip.

Merotohun made his official debut at the 2004 Summer Olympics in Athens, where he competed in both the singles and doubles tournaments. For his first event, the men's singles, Merotohun defeated Democratic Republic of the Congo's Momo Babungu in the preliminary round, before losing out his next match to Swedish table tennis player and five-time Olympian Jörgen Persson, with a set score of 1–4. Merotohun also teamed up with four-time Olympian Segun Toriola in the men's doubles, where they lost the first round match to the U.S. pair, Mark Hazinski and Ilija Lupulesku (former Olympic silver medalist from Serbia), receiving a unanimous set score of 0–4.

Four years after competing in his first Olympics, Merotohun qualified for his second Nigerian team, as a 30-year-old, at the 2008 Summer Olympics in Beijing, by placing second from the men's singles from the All-Africa Games, and receiving a continental spot for Africa in the men's team under ITTF's Computer Team Ranking List. Merotohun joined with his fellow players Kazeem Nosiru and Segun Toriola for the inaugural men's team event. He and his team placed third in the preliminary pool round, earning a total of four points, two defeats (against Japan and Hong Kong), and a single victory over the Russian team (led by Alexei Smirnov). In the men's singles, Merotohun lost the preliminary round match to Turkey's Cem Zeng, with a set score of 2–4.

References

External links
 
 NBC 2008 Olympics profile

1977 births
Living people
Nigerian male table tennis players
Table tennis players at the 2004 Summer Olympics
Table tennis players at the 2008 Summer Olympics
Olympic table tennis players of Nigeria
People from Ogun State
Commonwealth Games medallists in table tennis
Commonwealth Games gold medallists for Nigeria
Commonwealth Games silver medallists for Nigeria
Commonwealth Games bronze medallists for Nigeria
African Games gold medalists for Nigeria
African Games medalists in table tennis
African Games silver medalists for Nigeria
Table tennis players at the 2002 Commonwealth Games
Table tennis players at the 2006 Commonwealth Games
Competitors at the 2007 All-Africa Games
Competitors at the 2011 All-Africa Games
20th-century Nigerian people
21st-century Nigerian people
Medallists at the 2002 Commonwealth Games